Hermann Dietrich Upmann (1 May 1816 in Bielefeld-Altstadt, Germany – 29 January 1894 Bremen, Germany) was a banker, merchant and cigar manufacturer in Cuba, creator of the H. Upmann 1844 brand.

At 23 years old he embarked for the New World in 1839 to work for an import / export Company: The Gravenhorst & Co. During the voyage, a Briton persuaded him to stay in Havana where the tobacco business was flourishing. Upmann accepted the suggestion. He learned the processes and secrets of cigar manufacturing, purchased a local cigar factory at 85 San Miguel Street, Havana, and created the H. Upmann 1844 brand, which is among the oldest cigar brands in the world.

In 1855 he received the first of many prizes that he would obtain over the following years. He achieved the qualification of "Provider of His Majesty Don Alfonso XII, King of Spain". His is one of the five largest tobacco factories in Cuba. Hermann Upmann became a director of the Havana Cigar Brand Association, an organization that works to confront the production and sale of counterfeit cigars .

He nevertheless found the tropical climate in Cuba difficult, so he decided against a lasting stay. His youngest brother, August Ludwig Upmann (born 1818) started to work with him and thus stayed in Cuba. Hermann Dietrich Upmann returned to Germany in 1848 and founded the cigar company Gebrüder Upmann & Co. Bremen.

In 1864, his nephew, Heinrich Upmann, arrived in Cuba. With capital contributed mainly by his uncle, they founded an organization dedicated to banking operations - initially catering to tobacco dealers and manufacturers, whose operations were spread through the Antilles. The company grew to such an extent that it was transformed into a vertical operation: they took care of the seedbeds, plant, harvest, manufacture, pack and, with their own shipping company, transported their products to other markets.

Hermann Upmann retired in 1890, and was succeeded at H. Upmann & Co. by his nephew, Heinrich Upmann, who continued the business with his partners Heinrich Runken and Theodore Garbade. The later was president of the Union of Cigar manufacturers of the Island.

After Heinrich's death in 1914, he was succeeded by his nephews Hermann and Albert (Alberto) Upmann.

References 

1816 births
1894 deaths
German bankers
Cigar makers
Businesspeople from Bielefeld
Cuban businesspeople
19th-century German businesspeople
German expatriates